Aiya Rural LLG is a local-level government (LLG) of Southern Highlands Province, Papua New Guinea.

Wards
25. Aboba
26. Lameriga
27. Lapi
28. Bata
29. Maipata
30. Pira
31. Raguare
32. Roalamanda
33. Sumi
34. Uma
35. Usa
36. Yanguri 1
37. Yanguri 2
38. Akuna
39. Lagiri-Baita
40. Pawayamo
41. Puti
42. Wasa
43. Wasuma
44. Kengawe
45. Ripu/Maguta
46. Sugu
47. Sare

References

Local-level governments of Southern Highlands Province